Purcari is a commune in the Ștefan Vodă District of Moldova. It is composed of two villages, Purcari and Viișoara.

See also
 Purcari wine region
 Purcari (winery)

References

Communes of Ștefan Vodă District
Moldova–Ukraine border
Populated places on the Dniester